Keerbergen is a municipality located in the Belgian province of Flemish Brabant. The municipality comprises only the town of Keerbergen proper. On January 1, 2006, Keerbergen had a total population of 12,444. The total area is 18.39 km² which gives a population density of 677 inhabitants per km².

History
The oldest reference to Keerbergen appeared the eleventh century as Chierberghe, which was donated in 1036 by the lord of Incourt to the bishop of Liège.

References

External links

 
Official website - Available only in Dutch
 Gazetteer Entry

Municipalities of Flemish Brabant